Karuna Vijaykumar Jain (born 9 September 1985) is an Indian former cricketer who played as a wicket-keeper and right-handed batter. She appeared in five Test matches, 44 One Day Internationals and nine Twenty20 Internationals for India between 2004 and 2014. She scored one century and nine fifties in ODIs. She played domestic cricket for Karnataka, Air India, Nagaland and Pondicherry. She retired from cricket in July 2022.

Early life 
She was born in a family that appreciates sports. Her father was a competitive boxer and her mother played ball badminton.

References

External links
 
 

1985 births
Living people
Cricketers from Bangalore
Indian women cricketers
India women Test cricketers
India women One Day International cricketers
India women Twenty20 International cricketers
Karnataka women cricketers
Air India women cricketers
Nagaland women cricketers
Pondicherry women cricketers
South Zone women cricketers
Wicket-keepers